George Anthony Morgan Taylor, GC (30 October 1917 – 19 August 1972) was an Australian Volcanologist awarded the George Cross in 1952 for "conspicuous courage in the face of great danger" during the eruption of Mount Lamington in Papua from January to March 1951. Taylor was one of only five Australian civilians directly awarded the George Cross between its institution in 1941 and 1972 when it was replaced in the Australian honours system by the Cross of Valour.

Early life and career
Taylor was born in Moree, New South Wales, the son of George Taylor, a businessman, and Eileen May Taylor (née Morgan). He was educated at Maitland High School and Sydney Boys High School. He began his career as a staff trainee analytical chemist at BHP. On 29 April 1942 he enlisted in 2/4 Ordnance Stores Company, Australian Imperial Force. His service number was NX95673. Taylor was based in North Queensland until May 1945 when his company was deployed to New Britain, initially to Jacquinot Bay and then, after the Japanese surrender, to Rabaul until October 1946. Taylor was demobbed on 8 January 1947 finishing his military service as a WO1. He then enrolled at the University of Sydney in March 1947 graduating with a BSc in 1950. After graduation Taylor joined the Bureau of Mineral Resources as a Geologist Grade I on 20 March 1950. His first posting was in April 1950 as a vulcanologist, based at Rabaul, overseeing all volcanoes in Papua New Guinea.

George Cross

Mount Lamington, south-west of Popondetta is in the Oro Province, north of the Owen Stanley Range in eastern New Guinea. Five thousand feet high, it was not even recognised as a volcano until it began erupting on 18 January 1951. The main and catastrophic eruption took place on 21 January 1951. Over the next three months Taylor visited the volcano almost daily, sometimes staying overnight, collecting vital data to aid the rescue efforts.

The full citation was published on 22 April 1952 in a supplement to The London Gazette of 18 April 1952:

Taylor's investiture was performed by Donald Cleland, Acting Administrator of Papua and 
New Guinea, on 24 November 1952 in the Memorial Cemetery in Popondetta.

Later life and career
After the eruption, Taylor returned to Canberra to study the seismographical data he had collected. He married Lindsay Grace Barrow (née Hudson) on 4 April 1956. They had two sons and a daughter. In 1957 he was awarded a Master of Science from the University of Sydney. In February 1961 Taylor was appointed Senior Resident Geologist in Port Moresby. Taylor died on the island of Manam in Papua New Guinea on 19 August 1972 at the age of 54. He was acting head of the Australian Geological Survey Division at the time of his death. His ashes were buried at St John the Baptist Church, Reid in Canberra. A plaque in his honour appears on the George Cross Memorial in George Cross Park in Canberra.

References

Australian recipients of the George Cross
1917 births
1972 deaths
Australian volcanologists
Australian chemists
Australian scientists
People from Moree, New South Wales
University of Sydney alumni